Johnson & Higgins was one of the largest insurance brokerage firms in the world until it was acquired by Marsh & McLennan in 1997.  At that point based in New York the company had 8,400 employees.

History
Initially founded in 1845 in New York as Jones & Johnson by Walter Restored Jones, Jr. and Henry Ward Johnson, the company acquired its new name in 1854 when A. Foster Higgins replaced Jones who left to do business on his own.

By the 1990s, the company transitioned itself from an established broker of marine and other insurance policies to a provider of a full range of insurance consulting services.

By 1990 over 150 years later the company had around 8,400 employees worldwide and $1 billion in annual revenues, Johnson & Higgins was the fifth-largest insurance brokerage firm in the world and the largest that was privately owned.

References

Insurance companies of the United States
1845 establishments in the United States
Financial services companies established in 1845
Companies established in 1845
1997 mergers and acquisitions